Zavidat (also Romanized as Zavīdāt) is a village in Howmeh-ye Sharqi Rural District, in the Central District of Khorramshahr County, Khuzestan Province, Iran. At the 2006 census, its population was 33, in 6 families.

References 

Populated places in Khorramshahr County